Yersinella is a genus of bush crickets in the subfamily Tettigoniinae. They are native to Europe. The genus name commemorates the entomologist who described the type species in 1860.

Species
Two species are accepted:
 Yersinella beybienkoi La Greca, 1974
 Yersinella raymondi (Yersin, 1860)

References

Tettigoniinae
Tettigoniidae genera
Orthoptera of Europe